Magic Juan may refer to:

 Don "Magic" Juan (b. 1950), American rapper and TV personality
 Magic Juan (reggaeton musician) (b. 1971), American merengue musician